Rastislav Beličák is a Slovak footballer who plays as a midfielder who currently plays for FK Šaca. He retired from professional football in 2010.

Football career
Beličák grew up as a footballer in the youth system of MFK Košice, and stayed with the club when he started his professional career, before moving to Malaysian Super League team Terengganu FA in 2004. One year later, he moved back to his home country to play for FK Slavoj Trebišov and MFK Zemplín Michalovce before he was signed by Singapore side Geylang United.

On 11 April 2008, Beličák earned the Man-of-the-Match award for his excellent performance in the 1–0 win at Jalan Besar Stadium over his side's main rivals Tampines Rovers.

On 12 May 2008, Beličák scored his first goal for Geylang in a 2–1 loss to the Super Reds at the Yishun Stadium in the preliminary round of the Singapore Cup. His goal, which came in the 90th minute, forced the game into the extra time, but the game was eventually lost.

1977 births
Living people
Slovak footballers
FC VSS Košice players
Slovak expatriate sportspeople in Malaysia
Expatriate footballers in Malaysia
Singapore Premier League players
Geylang International FC players
Slovak Super Liga players
Terengganu FC players
Association football midfielders
Slovak expatriate sportspeople in Singapore